Djamaa el Djazaïr, also known as the Great Mosque of Algiers, is a mosque in Algiers, Algeria. It houses the world's tallest minaret and is the third-largest mosque in the world after the Great Mosque of Mecca and Al-Masjid an-Nabawi of Medina in Saudi Arabia.

History
The construction of the mosque began in August 2012 after the Algerian government's contract, for 1 billion euros, was won by the China State Construction Engineering Corporation. The design was done by German architects KSP Juergen Engel Architekten and engineers Krebs und Kiefer International and was completed by April 2019. The mosque faced construction delays owing to budgetary concerns due to the falling prices of oil. Around 2,300 workers from China, Algeria and other African countries were deployed to work on the project. The construction of the mosque was seen by many to serve as a symbol of the reign of long-serving president Abdelaziz Bouteflika.

Architecture
The mosque sits on a site covering 27.75 hectares and overlooking the Mediterranean Sea. The prayer hall has a capacity of 37,000 worshippers, while the structure including the compound can house up to 120,000 worshippers and has parking space for 7,000 cars. The complex also houses a Quran(قرآن) school, a park, a library, staff housing area, a fire station, a museum of Islamic art, and a research centre on the history of Algeria.

It also houses an observation deck atop the minaret, which has 37 floors. The mosque is designed to withstand an earthquake of magnitude 9.0 and the structure has been specially processed to resist corrosion.

See also
 Algerian Islamic reference
 Hizb Rateb (Hezzab, Bash Hezzab, Salka)
 Lists of mosques
 List of mosques in Africa
 List of mosques in Algeria
 List of tallest buildings in Algeria
 List of tallest buildings in Africa
 List of cultural assets of Algeria
 List of most expensive buildings

References

External links
 

Buildings and structures in Algiers
Islamic holy places
Mosques in Algiers
Mosques completed in 2019
Djazair
2019 establishments in Algeria
21st-century religious buildings and structures in Algeria